The Prow Beast is the fourth novel of the five-part Oathsworn series by Scottish writer of historical fiction, Robert Low, released on 5 August 2010 through Harper. The novel was well received.

Plot
The story revolves around Orm Rurikson, a young man who joined the crew of a Viking band as a child and is now their reluctant leader. This novel centres around the oathsworn band attempting to protect the pregnant Queen Sigrith from the combined forces of their old enemy Sterki and Styrbjorn, nephew to King Eirik, who is seeking to claim the throne by ridding himself of the current heir, Sigrith's child.

Reception
The novel was well received.

Gareth Wilson, writing for on-line review site Falcata Times, praised Low's ability to "search the tales of the ancient Norse to weave a thread that the Norn’s would be proud to call their own" and stated he was "sad to say that this is going to be the last offering in the Oathsworn series for a while". The novel was also reviewed by fellow historical fiction author Angus Donald, who stated that "I now have a bad case of PTT after reading the fourth and last book in Robert Low’s peerless Oathsworn series", with PTT being described as "post-textual tristesse" – a term Donald is used to refer to the sadness he feels after reading a particularly good novel. He also states that think the novel to be the best in the series, finding it "poignant, muscular, magical and impossible to put down."

References

External links
 

2010 British novels
Novels set in the Dark Ages
Scottish historical novels
Novels by Robert Low
HarperCollins books